Muhammad Yaqub (born 10 May 1937) is a Pakistani banker who served as the 12th Governor of the State Bank of Pakistan from 1993 to 1999.

Born on May 10, 1937, Yaqub did his Ph.D. in economics from Princeton University in 1966, M.A. Economics from University of the Punjab in 1959 and again from the Yale University in 1965.

References

Governors of the State Bank of Pakistan
University of the Punjab alumni
Princeton University alumni
Yale University alumni
1937 births
Year of death missing